Luc Owona Zoa (born January 23, 1979) is a former Cameroonian footballer.

Career
Zoa played as a central defender for C.F. Monterrey's affiliate Coyotes de Saltillo in the Primera A until 2001. He also played in the Premier Soccer League for Orlando Pirates.

Zoa made three Russian Premier League appearances for FC Spartak Moscow, before going on loan to Russian First Division side FC Anzhi Makhachkala.

Honours

Club honors
Orlando Pirates
Premier Soccer League (1): 2002–03

References

External links

1979 births
Footballers from Yaoundé
Living people
Cameroonian footballers
Cameroonian expatriate footballers
Orlando Pirates F.C. players
FC Spartak Moscow players
FC Anzhi Makhachkala players
Expatriate soccer players in South Africa
Expatriate footballers in Russia
Expatriate footballers in Indonesia
Russian Premier League players
Liga 1 (Indonesia) players
Association football defenders